Maria Yermolova-class ships are passenger ships built in the Titovo Brodogradiliste shipyard in Kraljevica, Yugoslavia in the 1970s. The construction of the ships was also known as project 1454.  The class was named after the lead ship of the project, the Maria Yermolova, built in 1974, named after Russian actress Maria Yermolova.

History 
The passenger ships of this project were made from 1974 to 1978, under a colossal provincial shipyard contract USSR signed by order of Leonid Brezhnev at the personal request of Marshal Tito for the salvation of this Croatian shipyard in Yugoslavia.  Eight ice-class vessels of  project 1454 were built, the only of their kind in the world. Three vessels were delivered to Murmansk Shipping Company (MMP), four to Far East Shipping Company (FESCO), and one vessel to the Sakhalin Shipping Company - NSR Kholmsk.  The vessels were built in two series.  The first series consisted of: Maria Yermolova, Maria Savina, Alla Tarasova and MV Lyubov Orlova.  The second series was: Olga Androvskaya, Olga Sadovskaya, Claudia Elanskaya and the Antonina Nezhdanoff.  The vessels were used as cruise ships for Soviet and foreign tourists.

FESCO eventually acquired five of the ships: Olga Androvskaya, Olga Sadovskaya, Lyubov Orlova, Maria Savina and Antonina Nezhdanoff.  Technical capabilities allowed the Antonina Nezhdanoff to go from Murmansk to her a new home port of Vladivostok along the Northern Sea Route in just 12 days.

Technical equipment 
Twin screw, unlimited navigation area with good driving characteristics. Seaworthy vessels have a diesel drive with two diesel engines 8M 35BF 62, manufactured in Yugoslavia, which allow a speed of over 17 knots.

On board 
Vessels of this class according to the project had 206 beds and 28 places for wheelchairs and are equipped with aircraft type stabilizers and air conditioning in all passenger spaces. Individual bathrooms are equipped with toilet, washbasin and shower cabins below a sofa bed, and the upper shelves were "pullman"-type beds.  Ten cabins were equipped with folding children's beds.  In the aft upper deck was a restaurant with 100 seats.  In addition there are 2 cafes, one 40-seat bar and a café-cinema with 60 seats, a music room with a bar, dance floor and bandstand (87 seats).  The public areas of the ship could additionally accommodate 327 people.

Court project 1454 
The list contains the original name of the vessel, its name change is indicated in parentheses in chronological order :

Court Project 1454
The first series
 Maria Ermolova
 Maria Savina (Sampaguita Ferry 2)
 Alla Tarasova (Clipper Adventurer)
 Lyubov Orlova (Lyubov Orlova)
The second series
 Olga Androvskaya
 Olga Sadovskaya (Ocean Star)
 Claudia Elanskaya
 Antonina Nezhdanoff

Overview 
The list contains all the vessels of the court in a footnote indicating the original name :

See also 
 List of cruise ships

References 

Passenger ships of Russia
Soviet Union–Yugoslavia relations
Passenger ships of the Soviet Union
1970s in Croatia
1970s in the Soviet Union